We Shall Return is a 1963 American drama film directed by Philip S. Goodman and starring Cesar Romero and Anthony Ray. It follows the flight of and eventual return of Cuban refugees in Miami following the Cuban Revolution of 1959. It features a fictitious plan to overthrow Fidel Castro, which proves successful, allowing the emigres to go home. Shot predominantly on location in Florida, the film would have its world premiere there as well, on February 15, 1963.

More than half a century later, We Shall Return retains the distinction of being both the only feature film written directly for the screen by novelist Pat Frank (whose work had already formed the basis for the 1956 film Hold Back the Night and numerous TV dramas, and would soon do so for Howard Hawks' 1964 comedy Man's Favorite Sport) and the only one scored by noted jazz saxophonist and composer-arranger Ed Summerlin.

See also
List of American films of 1963

References

External links 
 

1963 films
1963 drama films
American black-and-white films
1960s Spanish-language films
Films about revolutions
American drama films
Films shot in Florida
Films set in Miami
1960s English-language films
1960s American films